Knipper is a surname. Notable people with the surname include:

Billy Knipper (1882–1968), American race car driver
Lev Knipper (1898–1974), Russian composer, nephew of Olga
Olga Knipper (1868–1959), Russian and Soviet stage actress

Surnames of German origin